Simone Del Nero  (born 4 August 1981) is an Italian former footballer.

Club career
Born in Carrara, Massa-Carrara, Del Nero grew up in the youth system of Empoli. He played just four senior games in two years for the Tuscans before moving to Brescia. Upon joining the Rondinelle, Del Nero at first played with the youth team, developing as a player under the guidance of youth coach and former professional, Luciano De Paola.

Del Nero made fleeting appearances for the senior side, before a disappointing stint on loan with Scottish outfit Livingston. He returned to Brescia for the 2002–03 season, where he made three appearances before another loan spell, this time to Sicily with Palermo, at the time in Serie B. However, Del Nero did not play a game with the rosanero and returned north at the season's end.

Del Nero had a breakout year in 2003–04, the first in which he established himself as a regular and consistently played in the senior side. In 2004–05, he remained a regular, but did not manage to save his team from relegation.

Del Nero was one of the most talented young players at Brescia with his former coach, Mario Somma, a great admirer. He remained a regular under Rolando Maran and Zdeněk Zeman in his last two years at the club, 2005–06 and 2006–07, both of which were spent in Serie B.

In the summer of 2007, Del Nero was available on a free transfer as he was out-of-contract at Brescia and was quickly signed to a five-year deal by giants Lazio, who were preparing for a return to the UEFA Champions League, having just finished third in Serie A.

Lazio were drawn to face Romanian champions Dinamo București in the Champions League qualifiers and, in the second leg, Del Nero proved decisive. Having only managed a 1–1 draw in Rome, the biancocelesti travelled to Bucharest needing a win and Del Nero won an early penalty for the first goal before setting up the second, with Lazio going on to win 3–1 and qualify for the group stage. Unfortunately for the Ligurian, he did not take any part in the group phase, and only managed five Serie A appearances due to injury. At the end of the 2007–08 season, Del Nero underwent an operation in Finland for plantar fasciitis.

That surgery had kept him out for much of the 2008–09 season as well, but he made a return to action on 14 December 2008, playing the first half of Lazio's draw against Udinese. Del Nero went on to make a handful more appearances towards the end of the season, including a substitute appearance in the 2009 Coppa Italia Final, which Lazio won on penalties. The Coppa was Del Nero's first title with the Roman club.

He joined Malaysia Super League club, Johor Darul Ta'zim in 2013. He bagged his first goal in 2013 Malaysia Super League when Johor Darul Ta'zim draw 2–2 against LionsXII at Tan Sri Dato Haji Hassan Yunos Stadium on 19 February 2013.
Fitness and injury problems restricted his playing time at Johor, affecting his performance on the pitch, and he rejected an offer to be loaned to sister club Johor FA, resulting in the end of his spell in Johor. On 6 April 2013, together with fellow import player Dani Guiza, they played their last game for Johor Darul Ta'zim in a Malaysia FA Cup semi final first leg match, which ended in 2–3 defeat to Selangor FA.

Del Nero joined Serie D club Massese in the end of 2013.

On 30 July 2016, he was sent on loan to Carrarese for the 2016–17 season, along with fellow striker Gennaro Tutino, who arrived from Napoli.

Coaching career
Del Nero was appointed as head of youth at Lavagnese in 2022.

International career
Del Nero was a part of the Italy U-21 side which emerged victorious in the 2004 UEFA European Under-21 Championship and also won a bronze medal with the Italian Olympic team at the 2004 Summer Olympics.

Del Nero has never been called up to the senior Italian national team.

Honours

Club
Lazio
Coppa Italia: 2008–09
Supercoppa Italiana: 2009

International
Italy
 UEFA European Under-21 Championship: 2004
 Olympic bronze medal: 2004 Summer Olympics

Orders
 5th Class / Knight: Cavaliere Ordine al Merito della Repubblica Italiana: 2004

References

External links
 
  
 
 
 

1981 births
Living people
People from Carrara
Italian footballers
Association football forwards
Empoli F.C. players
Brescia Calcio players
Livingston F.C. players
S.S. Lazio players
A.C. Cesena players
U.S. Massese 1919 players
Johor Darul Ta'zim F.C. players
Serie A players
Serie B players
Serie C players
Serie D players
Scottish Premier League players
Expatriate footballers in Scotland
Expatriate footballers in Malaysia
Italian expatriate sportspeople in Scotland
Italian expatriate sportspeople in Malaysia
Olympic footballers of Italy
Olympic bronze medalists for Italy
Footballers at the 2004 Summer Olympics
Italy under-21 international footballers
Italian expatriate footballers
Olympic medalists in football
Medalists at the 2004 Summer Olympics
Knights of the Order of Merit of the Italian Republic
Sportspeople from the Province of Massa-Carrara
Footballers from Tuscany